Büjiin Jalbaa (born 15 July 1943) is a Mongolian speed skater. He competed in the men's 1500 metres event at the 1968 Winter Olympics.

References

1943 births
Living people
Mongolian male speed skaters
Olympic speed skaters of Mongolia
Speed skaters at the 1968 Winter Olympics
People from Khövsgöl Province
20th-century Mongolian people